The House of Baux is a French noble family from the south of France. It was one of the richest and most powerful families of Medieval Provence, known as the 'Race d’Aiglon'. They were independent Lords as castellans of Les Baux and Arles and wielded very considerable authority at local level. They held important fiefs and vast lands, including the principality of Orange.

In  (and in Provençal-Occitan) is the word for 'cliffs, escarpment'. In its use as the family name, it refers to the natural fortress on which the family built their castle, the Château des Baux and the village that surrounded it. The escarpment provided a raised and protected mountain valley that protected their food supply; the natural ridge of the Alpilles allowed control of all the approaches to the citadel of Les Baux-de-Provence and the surrounding countryside, including the passage up and down the Rhone, and the approaches from the Mediterranean. Together, these natural advantages made the fortress impervious to the military technology of the time.

The family of des Baux exists today in Naples in the person of several noble families ("del Balzo") descended from younger sons who followed Charles of Anjou south.
When Provence was united with the crown, almost 150 yrs of royal governors followed, including the lords, later counts and princes de Manville. Les Baux became a centre for Protestantism. Its unsuccessful revolt against the crown led Cardinal Richelieu in 1632 to order that the castle and its walls should be demolished. This was accomplished with the aid of artillery.

Lords of Baux

The earliest definite ancestor was Pons ('Pons the younger'). The name may indicate a trader from Greece, while his soubriquet, the younger, distinguished him from  his father Pons the elder. Pons the younger was mentioned in three legal acts:
 1st in the act of donation of 14 May 971 donating Montmajour to Boson & his wife Folcoare,
 2nd in 975 in the act of donation of land to St Etienne d'Arles, now called St. Trophime (Arch. du chap. d'Arles, liv. autent. f. 22)
 3rd with his wife Profecte in an act of donation in 981

The family descent then is:
Pons the Younger (born), father of
Hugh I (born after 1059), father of
  or "Guilhem Uc" (after 10301105), father of
Raymond I (before 10951150), father of
Hugh II (reigned 11501167; retired to Sardinia where he died in 1179)
Betrand I (1167–1181), brother of Hugh II
Hugh III (1181–1240), lord of Baux, viscount of Marseille, eldest son of Bertrand I
Barral of Baux (Barral I, 1240–1268), father of
Bertrand III (1268–1305), father of
Raymond II (1305–1322), father of
Hugh IV (1322–1351), father of
Robert (1351–1353)
Raymond III (1353–1372), brother of Robert, father of
John I (1372–1375)
Alice I (1372–1426), sister of John

This branch of the House of Baux was declared extinct in 1426.  The domains were inherited by Counts of Provence.

Lords of Berre, Meyragues, Puyricard and Marignane

 ...

Princes of Orange

  (1171–1181)
 Raymond II of Baux, (1218–1282)
 William II, co-Prince (with brothers),1218-1239
 Bertrand II, (1281–1314)
 Raymond III (1314–1340)
 Raymond V (1340–1393)
 Mary of Baux-Orange (1393–1417), daughter, married John III of Châlon-Arlay

In 1417, the House of Ivrea or House of Châlon-Arlay succeeded as princes of Orange.

A brother of William I started the branch of the Lords of Courbezon (House of Baux-Courbezon), which became extinct in 1393.  Another brother started the line of Lords of Suze, Solerieux and Barri (House of Baux-Suze-Solerieux-Barri), which became extinct and reverted afterwards to the counts of Orange.

Family Genealogy

Ancestors of the Lords of Baux
The ancestors of the Lords of Baux:

 Leibulf de Provence (vers 750-835)
   x Odda ?
   |
   | → Leibulf des Baux (middle of the 9th century).
         x ??
         |
         | →  Pons d’Arles (end of the 9th century)
               x Blismodis de Mâcon
               |
               | → Humbert, Bishop of Vaison-la-Romaine (890-933)
                    |
               | → Ison d’Arles (890-942),
                     x Princess ? of Benevento
                     |
                     | →  Lambert Ursus seigneurs de Reillanne
                     |     x Galburge de Bénévent
                     |     |
                     |     | →  Seigneurs de Reillanne
                     |
                     | →  Pons de Marseille (910-979), 
                          x   Judith de Bretagne, daughter d'Alain II de Bretagne
                          |
                          | → Honoratus de Marseille (930-978), Bishop of Marseille
                          |
                          | →  William of Marseille (935-1004)
                          |    x Bellilde, daughter d’Arlulf de Marseille
                          |    |
                          |    | →  Vicomtes de Marseille
                          |                                 
                          x  Belletrude
                          |
                          | →  (hyp) Pons de Fos (vers 945-1025)
                                x Profecta de Marignane
                                |
                                | →  Seigneurs de Fos
                                |
                                | →  (hyp) Hugues des Baux (981-1060) 
                                    x Inauris de Cavaillon (?)
                                    |
                                    | → Guillaume Hugues de Baux (1060–1095)
                                         x Vierne
                                         |
                                         | → Raymond-Raimbaud des Baux (1095–1150)
                                              x Étiennette de Gévaudan 
                                              |
                                              | → Bertrand des Baux 
                                                   x Thiburge II d'Orange

Simplified Family Tree of the Lords of Baux

The family tree of the lords of Baux:

See also 
 Les Baux de Provence
 Les Baux de Provence AOC
 Baussenque Wars (1144–1162)
 Il signore di Baux
 :fr:Alix des Baux

Notes

References

Bibliography

Sources for the Vicomtes de Marseille
Édouard Baratier, Ernest Hildesheimer et Georges Duby, Atlas historique...
and the table of Henry de Gérin-Ricard, Actes concernant les vicomtes de Marseille et leurs descendants...

Sources: Ancestors of the Lords of Baux section

Genealogy works
Georges de Manteyer, La Provence du premier au douzième siècle, études d'histoire et de géographie... (1908),
Juigné de Lassigny, Généalogie des vicomtes de Marseille...,
Fernand Cortez, Les grands officiers royaux de Provence au moyen-âge listes chronologiques...,
Papon, de Louis Moréri, du marquis de Forbin, Monographie de la terre et du château de Saint-Marcel, près Marseille: du Xe au XIXe siècle... ("Monograph of the land and the castle of Saint-Marcel, near Marseille, from the tenth to the nineteenth century ..."), Marseille, 1888
J. Berge, Origines rectifiées des maisons féodales Comtes de Provence, Princes d'Orange ..., France-Riviera, 1952
Poly, Jean-Pierre, La Provence et la société féodale (879-1166), Paris: Bordas, 1976,
Jacques Saillot, Le Sang de Charlemagne...

Sources: Simplified family tree section

Genealogy works
 Gioacchino del Balzo di Presenzano, http://www.delbalzo.net/genealogia2.htm GENEALOGY Maison del Balzo/des Baux extensive bibliographyG.Noblemaire, Histoire de la Maison des Baux, Parigi: 1912 and 1975
J.Dunbabin, Charles I  of Anjou, London/New York: 1998
E.Leonard,Les Angevins de Naples, Paris: 1954
Almanach of Gotha, 1888-1943
F. Mazel,La Noblesse et l’Eglise en ProvenceFin X – debut XIV siecle, L’Exemple des familles d’Agoult-Simiane, des Baux et de Marseilles, CTHS – Paris: 2002
H.Aliquot et R.Merceron,Armorial d’Avignon et Du Comtat Venaissin'', Avignon:1987
Cambridge Medieval History, Volumes I – IX, Cambridge: 1911
Cambridge Medieval History, Vol  II, III, IV, Revised Edition 1996 -2003
Cambridge Modern History, Volumes I-XII, Cambridge: 1962-63

External links 
 GENEALOGY Maison del Balzo/des Baux by Gioacchino del Balzo with extensive bibliography
 Grand Armorial du Comtat Venaissin by Jean Gallian 
 History of Les Baux en Provence

 
Bouches-du-Rhône
Baux

ca:Senyoria dels Baus
de:Les Baux (Adelsgeschlecht)
fr:Liste des seigneurs des Baux